The 2018 Rakuten Japan Open Tennis Championships was a men's tennis tournament played on indoor hard courts. It was the 45th edition of the Japan Open, and part of the 500 Series of the 2018 ATP World Tour. It was held at the Musashino Forest Sport Plaza in Tokyo, Japan, from October 1–7, 2018.

Points and prize money

Point distribution

Prize money

Singles main-draw entrants

Seeds

 1 Rankings are as of September 24, 2018.

Other entrants
The following players received wildcards into the singles main draw:
  Taro Daniel 
  Yoshihito Nishioka 
  Yūichi Sugita

The following player received entry as a special exempt:
  Taylor Fritz

The following players received entry from the qualifying draw:
  Martin Kližan 
  Denis Kudla 
  Daniil Medvedev 
  Yosuke Watanuki

Withdrawals
Before the tournament
  David Goffin → replaced by  Matthew Ebden
  Lucas Pouille → replaced by  Jan-Lennard Struff

Doubles main-draw entrants

Seeds

 Rankings are as of September 24, 2018.

Other entrants
The following pairs received wildcards into the doubles main draw:
  Yoshihito Nishioka /  Kaito Uesugi 
  Joe Salisbury /  Yasutaka Uchiyama

The following pair received entry from the qualifying draw:
  Fabrice Martin /  Gilles Simon

Champions

Singles

  Daniil Medvedev def.  Kei Nishikori 6–2, 6–4

Doubles

  Ben McLachlan /  Jan-Lennard Struff def.  Raven Klaasen /  Michael Venus 6–4, 7–5

References

External links 
 

 
Rakuten Japan Open Tennis Championships
Japan Open (tennis)
Rakuten Japan Open Tennis Championships
Japan Open Tennis Championships